Balqasah (also spelled Belukseh) is a village in northern Syria located northwest of Homs in the Homs Governorate. According to the Syria Central Bureau of Statistics, Balqasah had a population of 2,078 in the 2004 census, making it the third largest locality in the subdistrict of Khirbet Tin Nur. Its inhabitants are predominantly Alawites.

References

Bibliography

 

Populated places in Homs District
Alawite communities in Syria